was a tozama feudal domain under the Tokugawa shogunate of Edo period Japan.  It was located in Echigo Province, Honshū. The domain was centered at Muramatsu Jin'ya (later renamed Muramatsu Castle), located in what is now part of the city of Gosen in Niigata Prefecture.

History
Upon the death of Hori Naoyori, daimyō of Murakami Domain, a 30,000 koku portion of his holdings was separated out into a separate domain for his younger son,  Hori Naotoki. This marked the start of Muramatsu Domain. However, to be more precise, Hori Naotoki built his seat at Yasuda in Echigo Province, and it was not until the time of his son, Hori Naoyoshi, that the jin'ya was moved to Muramatsu. The area of the domain was mostly mountainous and unsuited to the development of new rice lands. Its actual kokudaka was only around 40,000 koku. Although Hori Naoyoshi attempted a survey and land reform, he died before it could be completed and the domain was perennially in debt. During the time of the 8th daimyō, Hori Naoyasu, some fiscal reforms were initiated, which resulted in a peasant uprising in 1814. During the time of the 9th daimyō, Hori Naohide, a more successful reform was implemented, with woven goods, washi, green tea, and a form of ceramics known as Muramatsu-yaki developed to supplement the domain's income. The domain was also raised in status from a jin'ya domain to a castle domain in 1850.

During the Bakumatsu period, the samurai of the domain were sharply divided between a conservative faction led by the 11th daimyō, Hori Naoyoshi, and a pro-Sonnō jōi faction. During the Boshin War, Hori Naoyoshi led the domain into the Ōuetsu Reppan Dōmei, but he switched sides after only a few months.  In July 1871, with the abolition of the han system, Muramatsu Domain briefly became Muramatsu Prefecture, and was merged into the newly created Niigata Prefecture. Under the new Meiji government, Hori Naohiro, the final daimyō of Muramatsu Domain was given the kazoku peerage title of shishaku (viscount). The site of former Muramatsu Castle is now a park.

Bakumatsu period holdings
As with most domains in the han system, Muramatsu Domain consisted of several discontinuous territories calculated to provide the assigned kokudaka, based on periodic cadastral surveys and projected agricultural yields.
Echigo Province
104 villages in Kambara District

List of daimyō

Hori Naotoki
 was the 1st daimyō of Yasuda Domain (Muramatsu). He was the second son of Hori Naoyori of Iiyama Domain in Shinano Province and received a 30,000 koku fief in Echigo Province on his father's death, becoming an independent daimyō. He was married to a daughter of Ikeda Nagayoshi of Bitchū-Matsuyama Domain, but died in 1643 at the age of 28 without an heir.

Hori Naoyoshi (d.1676)
 was the 2nd daimyō of Yasuda Domain (Muramatsu). He was the second son of Hori Naotoki and became daimyō on his father's death in 1643. In May 1644 he relocated his seat from Yasuda to Muramatsu. He was married to a daughter of Hori Naotsugu of Murakami Domain. He died in 1676 after an uneventful tenure.

Hori Naotoshi
 was the 3rd daimyō of Muramatsu Domain. He was the second son of Hori Naoyoshi and became daimyō on his father's death in 1676. In 1705 he served in the shogunal administration as a sōshaban and as  jisha-bugyō. He was married to a daughter of Toda Mitsunaga of Kanō Domain. He retired from his offices in 1711 and died in 1716.

Hori Naoyuki
 was the 4th daimyō of Muramatsu Domain. He was the second son of Hori Naotoshi and became daimyō on his father's retirement in 1716. he subsequently served as Osaka kaban. He was married to a daughter of Koide Fusasada of Sonobe Domain. He retired from his offices in 1736 and died in 1743.

Hori Naotaka
 was the 5th daimyō of Muramatsu Domain. He was the eldest son of Hori Naoyuki and became daimyō on his father's retirement in 1736. He was married to a daughter of Matsudaira Yorisada of Moriyama Domain. He ruled to his death in 1785, outliving the first five of his sons.

Hori Naonori
 was the 6th daimyō of Muramatsu Domain. He was the sixth son of Hori Naotaka and became daimyō on his father's death in 1785. He was married to a daughter of Matsudaira Yoritaka of Matsuyama Domain. He retired in 1795, appointing his nephew, the son of Hori Naoyasu, his eldest brother, as his heir. He died in 1812.

Hori Naokata
 was the 7th daimyō of Muramatsu Domain. He was the eldest son of Hori Naoyasu, the eldest son of Hori Naotaka and became daimyō on Naonori's retirement in 1795 without an heir. He was married to a daughter of Kinoshita Toshitane of Hiji Domain. He retired in 1802 and died three years later in 1805.

Hori Naoyasu (d.1819)
 was the 8th daimyō of Muramatsu Domain. He was the second son of Hori Naokata, and became daimyō on his father's retirement in 1802. He was married to a daughter of Inaba Hiromichi of Usuki Domain. In 1814, the peasants of the domain rose up in a widespread revolt against many ears of corruption and overtaxation by the hereditary karō and other domain officials. He died in 1819.

Hori Naohide
 was the 9th daimyō of Muramatsu Domain. He was the third son of Hori Naokata, and became daimyō on his brother's death in 1819. He was married to a daughter of Tsugaru Yasuchika of Hirosaki Domain and later remarried to a daughter of Tsuchiya Hidenao of Tsuchiura Domain. His name is also read as Hori Naohisa. In 1843, he sponsored the reconstruction of the Ueno Daibutsu. In 1850, the status the domain was raised to that of a "castle-holding domain" by the Tokugawa shogunate, and he expanded Muramatsu jin'ya accordingly. From 1853, he worked on restructuring the domain's finance though a combination of domainal monopolies, agrarian reforms and fiscal restraint. The Ueno Daibutsu was severely damaged in the Ansei great earthquakes, and he again sponsored the rebuilding. He retired in 1857 and died in 1861.

Hori Naoyasu (d.1860)
 was the 10th daimyō of Muramatsu Domain. He was the second son of Hori Naohide by a concubine, and became daimyō on his father's retirement in 1857. He was married to a daughter of Katō Yasumoto of Ōzu Domain.  He continued his father's policies, but dropped suddenly dead while walking along a road in 1860.

Hori Naoyoshi (d.1903)
 was the 11th daimyō of Muramatsu Domain. He was the grandson of Hori Naonori, and became daimyō on his father's sudden death in 1860. During the Bakumatsu period, the domain was violently divided between supporters of the Sonnō jōi movement and those of the shogunate. The domain did join the Ōuetsu Reppan Dōmei and sent forces in support of Nagaoka Domain during the Boshin War, many of which escaped to Yonezawa Domain after the Battle of Hokuetsu. The domain surrendered  to the Meiji government in 1868. Hori Yayoshi was forced to retire. In 1877 he changed his surname to "Okuda". He died in 1910 and his grave is at Yanaka Cemetery in Tokyo.

Hori Naohiro
 was the 12th (and final) daimyō of Muramatsu Domain. He was the third son of Hori Naoyasu, and became daimyō on his father's forced retirement in 1868. His wife was a daughter of the kuge Sawa Nobuyoshi. In 1869, he was appointed imperial governor of Muramatsu under the Meiji government, holding that post to the abolition of the han system in 1871. In 1877 he changed his surname to "Okuda". He subsequent received the kazoku peerage title of shishiku (viscount). He died in 1919.

See also
 List of Han

Notes

References
The content of this article was largely derived from that of the corresponding article on Japanese Wikipedia.

External links
 Muramatsu Domain on "Edo 300 HTML"

Domains of Japan
History of Niigata Prefecture
Echigo Province
Ōuetsu Reppan Dōmei
Gosen, Niigata
Hori clan